Simona Nicoleta Lazăr is a Romanian poet, writer, journalist, food critic, gastronom, publisher and author of cookbooks. She is a member of the Union of Professional Journalists of Romania (UZP) and of the Association of Journalists and Writers of Tourism of Romania (AJTR). She is married with the journalist Valentin Țigău. Her press name is Simona Lazăr while her civil name is Simona Nicoleta Țigău.

Education 
The secondary and high school courses follow in Bacău (School no. 5 "Alexandru cel Bun", School no. 16 "Alecu Russo" (1983), Economic and Administrative Law High School (1987) - today "Ion Ghica Economic College" "Bacău). She studies at the Economic University College of the Valahia University in Târgoviște, graduating with the profile of Library and Archive with a thesis on the "Localia" and "Personalia" Funds of the libraries (2003). She continues her studies at the Faculty of Letters of the University of Bucharest,

the Department of Information and Documentation Sciences, with a thesis on the topic "Contributions to the history of Romanian cookbooks from the 19th century, in the European context" (2019). She is a master of the Faculty of Letters of the University of Bucharest, the program "Information Management in the Contemporary Society".

Books 
 Somnul grifonului (poems, Deșteptarea, 1996) -  (The griffin's sleep)
 Iarba manuscriselor (poems, Plumb, 1997) -  (Grass of manuscripts)
 Corabie spre Magonia (poems, Semne, 1998) -  (Caravel to Magonia)
 Toamnă în Casiopeea (poems, Ager, 2004) -  (Autumn in Casiopeea)
 Cărticică folositoare (Intact, 2005) -  (Helpful little book)
 Maria Maurer. Carte de bucate (Jurnalul, 2006)  (Maria Maurer. Cookery book)
 Rețete de Paști (Jurnalul, 2007) -  (Easter recipes)
 Rețete alese pentru post și Crăciun (Jurnalul, 2010) -  (Recipes chosen for fasting and Christmas)
 Constantin Bacalbașa. Dictatura gastronomică. 1501 feluri de mâncări (Cartex, 2009) -  (Constantin Bacalbașa. Gastronomic dictatorship. 1501 dishes)
 Christ Ionnin. Bucătăria română. 1865 (GastroArt, 2018) -  (Christ Ionnin. Romanian cuisine. 1865)
 Christ Ionnin. Bucătăria română. 1865 (3rd edition, GastroArt, 2019) (Christ Ionnin. Romanian cuisine. 1865)
 Maria Maurer. Carte de bucate. 1849 (GastroArt, 2019) (Maria Maurer. Cookery book. 1849)
 J.C. Hințescu. Bucătăreasa națională. 1874 (GastroArt, 2019) (J.C. Hinţescu. The national lady cook. 1874)
 Constantin Bacalbașa. Rețete interbelice (GastroArt, 2019) (Constantin Bacalbașa. Interwar recipes)
She prefaced the books: 
 "Culinary recipes from Turda", Dana Deac, reDiscover publishing house, Cluj Napoca, 2005 - 
"Useful book"/"Cărticica folositoare" (reprinting the first book of domestic economy published in Bucharest, in 1806), Jurnalul Publishing House, Bucharest, 2005 - 
 "Cookbook. 190 recipes chosen and tried by a friend of all the women of the housewives", by Maria Maurer (reprinting the first cookbook printed in the Romanian Country, in 1849, in Bucharest), Jurnalul Publishing House, Bucharest, 2006 - 
 "Our dishes. Books with more or less Romanian preparations", Horia Vîrlan, NOI Publishing House - Mediaprint, Bucharest, 2009 - 
 "77 Stories and recipes from the Golden Age", Veronica Bectaș, Cartex Publishing House, Bucharest, 2010 - 
 She curated the newest edition of Radu Anton Roman's cookbook, which appeared in a new format, illustrated and revised, under the title "Stories of Romanian Cuisine" (7 volumes, Jurnalul Publishing House and Paideia Publishing House, 2010). In this new series, the preface to volume II is signed by Simona Lazăr -

Awards 

 AJTR 2009 Prize (Association of Journalists and Tourism Writers of Romania) for the neat and annotated edition of the volume "Gastronomic dictatorship. 1501 dishes" by Constantin Bacalbașa, Cartex Publishing, 2009. 
 ANBCT 2009 Prize (National Association) of Cooks and Confectioners from Tourism) for the well-edited and annotated edition of the volume "Gastronomic dictatorship. 1501 dishes" by Constantin Bacalbașa, Cartex Publishing House, 2009. 
 AJTR 2009 Award for Reporting (Association of Journalists and Tourism Writers of Romania) for articles published in the National Journal, the Kitchen Journal and the Travel Journal. She is nominated for the Tourism Press Club of FIJET Romania Award for 2009, for the articles in the Travel Journal.
 AJTR 2010 Award (Association of Tourism Journalists and Writers of Romania) for coordinating the 7 volumes from "The Stories of Romanian Cuisine" by Radu Anton Roman (illustrated edition), Jurnalul Publishing House & Paideia Publishing House, 2010.
 AJTR 2013 Award for setting up and supporting the online publication "Tourism Press" - www.presadeturism.ro - the official site of the Association of Journalists and Tourism Writers of Romania (AJTR).
 AJTR 2015 Award, for the original concept of the show "Salt in the kitchen", the first "radio culinary show" in Romania.
 The Award of Excellence in Journalism at the Gala of the Union of Professional Journalists of Romania for 2015, the jury thus motivating the award given: “The guests of Simona Nicoleta Lazar always surprise by a reversal of the conveniences. Listening to them, you cannot miss a gymnastics exercise of the mind. I have watched it in countless radio editions and I have never been able to decode that magic ritual by which it manages to cause its interlocutor to release the unspoken thoughts until then. Her shows have great merit that make you listen. To accept. Think and talk. Simona Nicoleta Lazăr - the prize for excellence in journalism for the rediscovery and popularization of the spiritual, traditional and identity treasure of the Romanian village.”
 AJTR 2017, granted for the program "Holiday Ticket" from Romanian Radio Antena Satelor Broadcast.

References 

 Ion Rotaru - "A history of Romanian literature from the origins to the present", volume V, 2001, Niculescu Publishing House, pages 442-443 - 
 Eugen Budău - "Literary Bacău", 2004, Universitas XXI Publishing House, Iași, pages  784-785 - 
 Cornel Galben - "Poets from Bacău at the end of the millennium", Studion Publishing House, Bacău, 2005, pages 62–63 - 
 Cornel Galben - "Running through the text underground", Corgal Press Publishing House, Bacău, 2010, pages 64–66 - 
 Viorel Savin, Eugen Budău - "Writers from Bacău; dictionary", Plumb Publishing House, Bacău, 2000 - 
 Grigore Traian Pop - "A thousand post-December poets", in "Critical Notebooks", 2003, pages 78–83 - 
 Ion Murgeanu - "Excelsior. Literary medallions. Cultural essays", 2009, pages 88–91 - 
 Ioan Romeo Roșiianu - "Poetic enchantment and play poetry", in "Painters of words", TIPO Moldova Publishing House, 2015, pages 92–97 - 
 Laurențiu Ulici - "The Pride of the Narrow Line", in the newspaper "Curentul", August 19, 1999, page 19, in the section "Literary Chronicle", Bucharest
 Cezar Ivănescu - "Forward word", in the volume "Sleep of the griffin" by Simona Nicoleta Lazăr, pages 5–6 Publishing House Deşteptarea, 1996, Bacău
 Vlad Sorianu - "A fresh lira", in the newspaper "Viața Băcăuană", 3, no. 141, May 9–15, 1997, page 6, Bacău
 Vlad Sorianu - "Authors and books", in the magazine "Ateneu", 34, no. 9, Sep 1997, page 5, Bacău
 Radu Cârneci - "The journey to the essential", in the magazine "Rampa and the screen", 9, no. 7-8-9-10, 1998, pages 64–65, Bucharest
 Nicolae Dan Fruntelată - "The poem from the border of pain", in the journal "Exams", no. 131-132 / 11–17 January 1999, page 32, Bucharest
 Ștefan Vida Marinescu - "A dream boat", in the journal "Placebo - literature, art, ideas", no. 33,34,35 / 1999, year IV new series, page 23, Bucharest
 Marius Manta - "The provocation of images", in the newspaper "Awakening", no. 2505, August 26, 1998, page 13, Bacău
 Ioan Lazăr - "Authors and books", in the magazine "Ateneu", 34, no. 3, March 1997, page 5, Bacău
 Constantin Călin - "Marginalists at Dorador. A paragraph for Simona", in the newspaper "Awakening", 8, no. 2192, August 15, 1997, "Synthesize lit.- critic.- soc.", 8, no. 31, August 15, 1997, page 8, Bacău

Romanian women poets
1968 births
Women cookbook writers
Women food writers
Romanian journalists
Romanian food writers
Cookbook writers
Food writers
Romanian women journalists
Romanian writers
Living people